Nilmani Phookan (10 September 1933 – 19 January 2023) was an Indian poet in Assamese language and an academic. His work, replete with symbolism, is inspired by French symbolism and is representative of the genre in Assamese poetry. His notable works include Surya Henu Nami Ahe Ei Nodiyedi, Gulapi Jamur Lagna, and Kobita.

Phookan has won the 56th Jnanpith Award, India's highest literary award, for the year 2020. He was also awarded the 1981 Sahitya Akademi Award in Assamese for his poetry collection, Kavita (Kobita). He was awarded the Padma Shri by Government of India in 1990, and received the Sahitya Akademi Fellowship, the highest literary honor in India, given by Sahitya Akademi, India's National Academy of Letters in 2002.

Early life and education
Phookan was born in Dergaon in Golaghat district, Assam. He received his Master's degree in
History from Gauhati University in 1961. Although he had started writing poetry in the early 1950s.

Career
Phookan started his career as a lecturer at Arya Vidyapeeth College in Guwahati in 1964, where he worked until his retirement in 1992. He has also translated Japanese and European poetry into Assamese.

Phookan won the 56th Jnanpith Award, India's highest literary award, for the year 2020. He was also awarded the Assam Valley Literary Award in 1997, and in 2002 he received the Sahitya Akademi Fellowship, the highest literary honor in India, given by Sahitya Akademi, India's National Academy of Letters, reserved for "the immortals of literature". In 2019, he was awarded a D.Lit. by Dibrugarh University.

Works
 Surya Heno Nami Ahe Ei Nadiyedi ("The sun is said to come descending by this river"), 1963.
 Manas-pratima. Guwahati Book Stall, 1971.
 Phuli Thaka Suryamukhi Phultor Phale ("Towards the Blooming Sunflower"), 1971.
 Kabita. Sahitya Akademi Publications, 2001. .
 Selected Poems Of Nilmani Phookan. tr. by Krishna Dulal Barua. Sahitya Akademi Publications, 2007. .

Awards and recognition
 In December 2021, the prolific poet and writer Nilmani Phookan received the prestigious Jnanpith Award for his lifetime contribution in literature.
 In 1997, Phookan was awarded the Assam Valley Literary Award.
 He was awarded the 1981 Sahitya Akademi Award in Assamese for his poetry collection, Kavita (Kobita)
 He was awarded the Padma Shri by Government of India in 1990.

References

External links
 
 * Laureate of Assam-Nilamani Phookan( FacenFcats.com)
 Exploring Life, poems by Nilmani Phookan at Assam Tribune
 Poems by Nilmani Phookan

1933 births
2023 deaths
Recipients of the Padma Shri in literature & education
Recipients of the Sahitya Akademi Award in Assamese
Recipients of the Sahitya Akademi Fellowship
Recipients of the Jnanpith Award
Recipients of the Assam Valley Literary Award
Recipients of the Gangadhar National Award
People from Golaghat district
Assamese-language poets
Symbolist poets
People from Dergaon
Poets from Assam
Indian male poets
20th-century Indian male writers
20th-century Indian poets
Assam Valley Literary Award